is a Japanese wrestler. He competed at the 1996 Summer Olympics and the 2000 Summer Olympics.

References

External links
 

1973 births
Living people
Japanese male sport wrestlers
Olympic wrestlers of Japan
Wrestlers at the 1996 Summer Olympics
Wrestlers at the 2000 Summer Olympics
Sportspeople from Gunma Prefecture
Wrestlers at the 1998 Asian Games
Asian Games competitors for Japan
Asian Wrestling Championships medalists
20th-century Japanese people